Pontiac most often refers to:

Pontiac (automobile), a car brand
Pontiac (Odawa leader) ( – 1769), a Native American war chief

Pontiac may also refer to:

Places and jurisdictions

Canada
Pontiac, Quebec, a municipality
Apostolic Vicariate of Pontiac, now the Roman Catholic Diocese of Pembroke
Pontiac Regional County Municipality, Quebec, an administrative division
Pontiac (electoral district), in Quebec
Pontiac (provincial electoral district), in Quebec

United States
Pontiac, Illinois
Pontiac Correctional Center, a prison in Illinois
Pontiac, Indiana
Pontiac, Kansas
Pontiac, Michigan
Pontiac Silverdome, a stadium
Pontiac, Rhode Island
Pontiac Building, a registered historic place in Chicago, Illinois
Pontiac Mills, an 1863 NRHP-listed building in Rhode Island

Amtrak stations 
Pontiac station (Illinois)
Pontiac Transportation Center, in Michigan

Other uses 
Pontiac (album), 1987, by Lyle Lovett
USS Pontiac, any of several ships
Marvin Pontiac, a fictional character created by musician John Lurie
"Pontiac fever", a less severe form of legionellosis

See also

Pontic (disambiguation)
Pontiak
Pontac